Mariusz Okoniewski (born February 10, 1956 in Poznań, Poland - death February 10, 2006 in Śmigiel, Poland) was a Polish motorcycle speedway rider who was won Team Speedway Polish Championship six times and Polish Silver Helmet in 1976.

His son Rafał (b. 1980) is a speedway rider also. Rafał is only double Individual U-19 European Champion.

Mariusz Okoniewski died on his 50th birthday.

Career 
 Individual Under-21 European Championship
 1977 - 8th place (4 points)
 Individual Under-21 Polish Championship
 1979 - Polish Champion
 Golden Helmet
 1979 - 3rd place
 Silver Helmet (U-21)
 1976 - Winner
 1977 - 2nd place

References

See also 
 Poland national speedway team

1956 births
2006 deaths
Polish speedway riders
Sportspeople from Poznań